Mayberry Presbyterian Church is a historic Presbyterian church at 1127 Mayberry Church Road in Meadows of Dan, Patrick County, Virginia.  It is one of the "rock churches" founded by Bob Childress.  It was built in 1925, and is a one-story frame church building faced in natural quartz and quartzite stone.  It features Gothic styled lancet windows. The rock facing was added to the frame building in 1948.

It was listed on the National Register of Historic Places in 2007.

References

Presbyterian churches in Virginia
National Register of Historic Places in Patrick County, Virginia
Gothic Revival church buildings in Virginia
Churches completed in 1925
Buildings and structures in Patrick County, Virginia